The crag chilia (Ochetorhynchus melanurus) is a species of bird in the family Furnariidae (ovenbirds). It is endemic to Chile.

Taxonomy and systematics

The crag chilia was formerly placed in its own genus, Chilia. It is now placed in genus Ochetorhynchus with the straight-billed earthcreeper (O. ruficaudus) and band-tailed earthcreeper (O. phoenicurus). Two subspecies are recognized, O. m. melanurus and O. m. atacamae.

Description

O. m. melanurus is dark brown above with a rufous rump and flanks, grayish breast, and brown belly. O. m. atacamae is similarly colored but paler overall.

Distribution and habitat

The crag chilia is endemic to central and north-central Chile between approximately 27° and 35° south latitudes. It is found primarily at elevations from  but also at lower elevations in winter. Subspecies O. m. melanurus is found in the southern part of its range and O. m. atacamae is in the north.

It is found on shrubby rock hillsides and cliffs with sparse vegetation.

Behavior and ecology

The crag chilia's diet is predominantly arthropods but also includes seeds. It is usually a solitary forager that gleans from rocks and probes crevices.

The species is presumed to be monogamous and its nesting season to be the austral spring and summer. The nest is a bulky ball of sticks lined with feathers and is usually placed in a rock cavity, though some have been found in holes in earth banks and rural buildings.

Status

The crag chilia is considered of least concern by the IUCN. Though it has a restricted range, its habitat is rather remote and therefore not heavily disturbed by humans.

References

crag chilia
Birds of Chile
Endemic birds of Chile
crag chilia
crag chilia
Taxonomy articles created by Polbot